Gunda is a genus of moths. 

Gunda may also refer to:
Gunda (1998 film), an Indian action film
Gunda (1976 film), a Bangladeshi film
Gunda (2020 film), an American-Norwegian documentary film
Cordia dichotoma or gunda, in Hindi
Gunda (name), list of people named Gunda

See also
 Goonda, term for a hired thug